James R. Wilson is a Canadian curler from Shellbrook, Saskatchewan.

Awards
Canadian Curling Hall of Fame: 1985 (with all 1980 World champions team skipped by Rick Folk)
Saskatchewan Sports Hall of Fame: 1980 (1980 Rick Folk Curling Team)

Teams

Personal life
His brother Tom is a curler too and Jim's teammate.

References

External links
 
 Jim Wilson – Curling Canada Stats Archive
 Jim Wilson Gallery | The Trading Card Database

Living people
Canadian male curlers
Curlers from Saskatoon
World curling champions
Brier champions
Year of birth missing (living people)